The 2006 Victoria Park state by-election was a by-election held on 11 March 2006 for the Western Australian Legislative Assembly seat of Victoria Park in the inner southeastern suburbs of Perth.

Background
The by-election was triggered by the resignation of Labor member Dr Geoff Gallop on 16 January 2006. Gallop had represented the area since a by-election on 7 June 1986, and had served as a minister, shadow minister, Opposition Leader (1996–2001) and, finally, as Premier of Western Australia since 2001. Gallop announced his resignation as Premier and from State Parliament effective immediately in order to aid his recovery from depression, and that "in the interests of my health and my family, I've decided to rethink my career."

The Speaker of the Legislative Assembly advised Parliament on 7 March 2006 that he had received a letter from Gallop on 25 January announcing his resignation as the member for Victoria Park, and announced that under section 67(2) of the Electoral Act 1907, he had on 2 February 2006 directed the Acting Electoral Commissioner to proceed with an election in the district. The battle for Labor party preselection was hard fought, with 31-year-old DPP lawyer Ben Wyatt defeating former national president of the Liquor Hospitality and Miscellaneous Workers' Union, Helen Creed, at a vote on 1 February 2006 of the 14-member Administrative Committee. The by-election, called for 11 March 2006, attracted a total of eleven candidates, one of the largest in Western Australian electoral history.

The seat of Victoria Park, which elects a single member to the Western Australian Legislative Assembly using a preferential method, was established in 1929 by the Government of Western Australia under the Redistribution of Seats Act (No 1 of 1929), which was given assent by the Governor on 15 April 1929. The seat is considered a safe Labor Party seat, and has been held by the party between 1930 and 1945, and since the 1953 state election.

Timeline

Candidates 
The by-election attracted eleven candidates, significantly more than the previous Victoria Park election, which attracted only five candidates. Both major parties fielded a candidate, with the Greens, One Nation, Daylight Saving Party, Family First, the Christian Democrats and the unregistered Socialist Alliance also represented, as well as three independents.

One Nation candidate Sue Bateman made national headlines when it emerged that she was running for the seat of Victoria Park. The former One Nation president was accused of being a prolific online racist, using the forum Stormfront. She was also dismissive of Gallop's battle with depression, saying that average Joe did not have the luxury of becoming depressed.

Results 
As largely predicted, Ben Wyatt retained the seat for the Labor party, with a swing against him of 4.86%. Wyatt claimed victory within two hours and became one of three Aboriginal parliamentarians in Western Australia.

Voter turnout was low, given that Victoria Park is a safe Labor seat, with only 64% of voters casting their vote: the lowest for a by-election in the state since 1936.

References 

2006 elections in Australia
Western Australian state by-elections
2000s in Perth, Western Australia